Uulu  is a village in Häädemeeste Parish, Pärnu County, in southwestern Estonia.

References

Villages in Pärnu County